8776 Campestris, provisional designation , is a stony background asteroid from the central region of the asteroid belt, approximately 10 kilometers in diameter. It was discovered on 16 October 1977, by Dutch astronomer couple  Ingrid and Cornelis van Houten at Leiden Observatory, and Dutch–American astronomer Tom Gehrels at the Palomar Observatory in California, United States. The asteroid was named for the tawny pipit (Anthus campestris), a shorebird.

Orbit and classification 

Campestris is a non-family asteroid from the main belt's background population. It orbits the Sun in the central main-belt at a distance of 2.1–3.2 AU once every 4 years and 5 months (1,612 days). Its orbit has an eccentricity of 0.20 and an inclination of 3° with respect to the ecliptic.

Survey designation 

The survey designation "T-3" stands for the third Palomar–Leiden Trojan survey, named after the fruitful collaboration of the Palomar and Leiden Observatory in the 1960s and 1970s. Gehrels used Palomar's Samuel Oschin telescope (also known as the 48-inch Schmidt Telescope), and shipped the photographic plates to Cornelis and Ingrid van Houten-Groeneveld at Leiden Observatory where astrometry was carried out. The trio of astronomers are credited with the discovery of several thousand minor planets.

Naming 

This minor planet is named for the passerine bird Anthus campestris, or tawny pipit. It is on the Dutch Red List of birds endangered in the Netherlands. It is also on the European Red List of Birds as of 2015. The official naming citation was published by the Minor Planet Center on 2 February 1999.

Physical characteristics

Rotation period 

In 2012, two rotational lightcurves of Campestris were obtained from photometric observations taken at the Palomar Transient Factory in California.

Diameter and albedo 

According to the survey carried out by the NEOWISE mission of NASA's Wide-field Infrared Survey Explorer, Campestris measures 10.5 kilometers in diameter and its surface has an albedo of 0.058. The Collaborative Asteroid Lightcurve Link assumes a higher albedo of 0.10 and calculates a diameter of 7.5 kilometers.

References

External links 
 Asteroid Lightcurve Database (LCDB), query form (info )
 Dictionary of Minor Planet Names, Google books
 Asteroids and comets rotation curves, CdR – Observatoire de Genève, Raoul Behrend
 Discovery Circumstances: Numbered Minor Planets (5001)-(10000) – Minor Planet Center
 
 

008776
2287
Discoveries by Cornelis Johannes van Houten
Discoveries by Ingrid van Houten-Groeneveld
Discoveries by Tom Gehrels
Named minor planets
19771016